Oncideres pepotinga is a species of beetle in the family Cerambycidae. It was described by Martins in 1981. It is known from Argentina. It feeds on Schinopsis balansae and Schinopsis quebracho-colorado.

References

pepotinga
Beetles described in 1981